This is a list of governors of Nimruz. Nimruz is one of the 34 provinces of Afghanistan, in the southwest of the country on the borders of Iran and Pakistan.

List

References

Nimruz